Jason Lepine (born March 26, 1985) is a Canadian professional ice hockey defenceman.

Lepine played junior hockey for his hometown Cornwall Colts of the CCHL.

Lepine signed with the Corpus Christi Rayz of the Central Hockey League (CHL) for the 2006–07 season to commence his professional career. In 2007–08 he won a Southern Professional Hockey League (SPHL) championship with the Knoxville Ice Bears.

References

External links

1985 births
Living people
Canadian ice hockey defencemen
Sportspeople from Cornwall, Ontario
Albany River Rats players
Bakersfield Condors (1998–2015) players
Bloomington PrairieThunder players
Corpus Christi Rayz players
Grand Rapids Griffins players
HC '05 Banská Bystrica players
Rytíři Kladno players
Houston Aeros (1994–2013) players
Iserlohn Roosters players
Knoxville Ice Bears (SPHL) players
Peoria Rivermen (AHL) players
Rockford IceHogs (AHL) players
SHC Fassa players
Toledo Walleye players
Ice hockey people from Ontario
Canadian expatriate ice hockey players in the Czech Republic
Canadian expatriate ice hockey players in Slovakia
Canadian expatriate ice hockey players in Italy
Canadian expatriate ice hockey players in Germany
Canadian expatriate ice hockey players in the United States
Canadian expatriate ice hockey players in Finland